City of the Violet Crown is a term for at least two cities, Athens, Greece and Austin, Texas.

Athens, Greece
In one of his surviving fragments (fragment 76), the Greek lyricist poet Pindar wrote of Athens:

The climate of Attica is characterised by low humidity and a high percentage of dust in the air, which make sunsets display hues of violet and purple and the surrounding mountains often appear immersed in a purple haze. In Geoffrey Trease's novel, The Crown of Violet, the name is explained as referring to the mauve-tinted marble of the Acropolis hill.

Austin, Texas
According to the History Center in Austin, Texas, the phrase first appeared in The Austin Daily Statesman (now The Austin American Statesman) on May 5, 1890.

It was long believed to have originated in O. Henry's story "Tictocq: The Great French Detective, In Austin", published in his collection of short stories The Rolling Stone published October 27, 1894. In chapter 2 of Tictocq, O. Henry writes:

The phrase is generally thought to refer to the atmospheric phenomenon more commonly known as the Belt of Venus. The phrase is also said to be connected to the moonlight towers of Austin.

Another explanation is that, during the 19th century, residents began to call Austin the "Athens of the South" for its university.  With his sly reference to the poetry of Pindar, O. Henry may have been satirizing Austin's ambitious claim of a cultural link to ancient Athens.

References

External links
 Text of Tictocq

History of Athens
History of Austin, Texas
O. Henry